James Seaton (May 1822 – 18 November 1882) was a 19th-century Member of Parliament from Dunedin, New Zealand.

Seaton was born in Sorn, East Ayrshire, Scotland, and was one of the original settlers of Otago. He arrived on board the Philip Laing in 1848.

He represented the Caversham electorate from 1875 to 1879, when he retired.

References

1822 births
1882 deaths
Members of the New Zealand House of Representatives
New Zealand MPs for Dunedin electorates
Road incident deaths in New Zealand
People from East Ayrshire
Scottish emigrants to New Zealand
19th-century New Zealand politicians